Motoc may refer to:

People
 Mihnea Motoc, Romanian diplomat
 Iulia Motoc, Romanian lawyer

Places
 Village in Pâncești, Bacău, Romania